Süleyman Pasha (died 1357) was the son of Orhan, the second ruler of the newly established Ottoman Empire. He played a major role in early Ottoman expansion into Thrace in the 1350s. He died in a hunting accident in 1357.

References

Bibliography

Ottoman princes
Ottoman people of the Byzantine–Ottoman wars
1357 deaths
14th-century people from the Ottoman Empire
Deaths by horse-riding accident
Heirs apparent who never acceded
Sons of emperors